The 1993 Washington State Cougars football team was an American football team that represented Washington State University in the Pacific-10 Conference (Pac-10) during the 1993 NCAA Division I-A football season. In their fifth season under head coach Mike Price, the Cougars compiled a 5–6 record (3–5 in Pac-10, seventh), and outscored their opponents 271 to 248.

The team's statistical leaders included Mike Pattinson with 1,430 passing yards, Kevin Hicks with 497 rushing yards, and Deron Pointer with 996 receiving yards.

Starting quarterback Pattinson, a fifth-year senior from nearby Moscow, suffered a broken collarbone at homecoming against #21 California in mid-October and was lost for the season. Shawn Deeds came off the bench to lead the WSU to a decisive victory and a #25 ranking at 5–2, but the Cougars lost the next four games with Chad DeGrenier and Deeds at quarterback.

Schedule

Roster

NFL Draft
For the first time in three years, no Cougars were selected in the 1994 NFL Draft; four were selected the following year.

References

Washington State
Washington State Cougars football seasons
Washington State Cougars football